Burkholderia contaminans is a gram-negative, bacterium from the genus of Burkholderia and the family of Burkholderiaceae and belongs to the Burkholderia cepacia complex, which was isolated from cystic fibrosis patients in Argentina. Burkholderia acidipaludis can cause biliary sepsis.

References

External links
Type strain of Burkholderia contaminans at BacDive -  the Bacterial Diversity Metadatabase

Burkholderiaceae
Bacteria described in 2009